A Reckoning is the fourth studio album by New Zealand singer-songwriter Kimbra, and the first under the label Inertia and [PIAS], having previously been signed with the label Warner Music.  It was released on 27 January 2023. The album was promoted with the singles "Save Me", "Replay!" and "Foolish Thinking".

Background
Kimbra began working on her fourth album 'A Reckoning' in 2018, co-producing it with Ryan Lott of Son Lux. When asked about the delay between 2018's 'Primal Heart' and 'A Reckoning' in an interview with Billboard (magazine), Kimbra explained "I went through a stage of really struggling to write. Maybe it was because I was struggling to articulate what I was feeling."

Critical reception

A Reckoning was met with positive reception from music critics. AllMusic gave the album 4/5 stars, commenting "Kimbra's use of hip-hop and electronic music on A Reckoning fortifies her resilience". The Daily Telegraph also gave the album 4/5 stars, stating "Chunky piano chords pierce slithering, ghostly synths on the opening track, 'Save Me'. It is at once beautiful and malevolent, evolving into a further nine tracks exploring the nuances of cinematic and intimate reckonings". The Sydney Morning Herald gave a moderately positive rating of 3/5 stars for the album, stating "Kimbra has returned with A Reckoning - an album that smartly pares back the excesses of its predecessors and highlights the nuances of both her voice and her songwriting, without turning its back on formal and aesthetic weirdness", but later stated 'LA Type' and 'GLT', on which Kimbra raps, break the flow of the otherwise chic, streamlined album." Sputnikmusic believed that the experimentation was a positive aspect, and gave the album a 7.4/10, commenting "She took the liberty to branch out in whatever direction she felt needed and it actually gave the album an odd sense of cohesion."

Track listing

Notes
  signifies an additional producer

Personnel
Musicians
 Kimbra – lead vocals
 Ryan Lott – string arrangements (tracks 1, 10); vocals, piano (8)
 Rob Moose – viola, violin, string arrangements (1, 8)
 Taylor Graves – synthesizer (6), keyboards (7)
 Jacob Bergson – additional programming (6)
 Spencer Zahn – electric bass (7)
 Questlove – drums (7)

Technical
 Twerk – mastering
 Jon Castelli – mixing
 Eli Crews – vocal engineering (1–3, 5, 7–9)
 Spencer Zahn – vocal engineering (6, 10)
 John Rooney – engineering (7)

References

2023 albums
Kimbra albums